Alex Fasolo (born 8 June 1992) is a former Australian rules footballer who played for the Collingwood Football Club and the Carlton Football Club in the Australian Football League (AFL). He attended Trinity College in East Perth for his secondary schooling.

Career
Fasolo played for East Fremantle in the WAFL before being drafted by Collingwood with pick 45 in the 2010 AFL Draft.

Fasolo was Collingwood's first draft pick in 2010, and was given Simon Prestigiacomo's number 35 guernsey.

He made his debut in Round 12 of the 2011 season in the Queen's Birthday Clash against , scoring a goal with his first kick in League football.

Fasolo was nominated for the 2011 AFL Rising Star award after his round 22 match against .

He played three senior matches for the club in 2019 before retiring at the end of the season.

Personal
In 2017, it was revealed that Fasolo was battling with depression.

Statistics
 Statistics are correct to the end of the 2019 season

|- style="background:#eaeaea;"
! scope="row" style="text-align:center" | 2011
|  || 35 || 13 || 16 || 8 || 82 || 65 || 147 || 43 || 29 || 1.2 || 0.6 || 6.3 || 5.0 || 11.3 || 3.3 || 2.2
|- 
! scope="row" style="text-align:center" | 2012
|  || 1 || 24 || 28 || 20 || 236 || 135 || 371 || 113 || 64 || 1.2 || 0.8 || 9.8 || 5.6 || 15.5 || 4.7 || 2.7
|- style="background:#eaeaea;"
! scope="row" style="text-align:center" | 2013
|  || 1 || 3 || 1 || 2 || 24 || 9 || 33 || 12 || 5 || 0.3 || 0.7 || 8.0 || 3.0 || 11.0 || 4.0 || 1.7
|- 
! scope="row" style="text-align:center" | 2014
|  || 1 || 12 || 7 || 9 || 103 || 77 || 180 || 51 || 31 || 0.6 || 0.8 || 8.6 || 6.4 || 15.0 || 4.3 || 2.6
|- style="background:#eaeaea;"
! scope="row" style="text-align:center" | 2015
|  || 1 || 17 || 27 || 15 || 150 || 86 || 236 || 81 || 49 || 1.6 || 0.9 || 8.8 || 5.1 || 13.9 || 4.8 || 2.9
|- 
! scope="row" style="text-align:center" | 2016
|  || 1 || 12 || 25 || 6 || 99 || 73 || 172 || 44 || 36 || 2.1 || 0.5 || 8.3 || 6.1 || 14.3 || 3.7 || 3.0
|- style="background:#eaeaea;"
! scope="row" style="text-align:center" | 2017
|  || 1 || 19 || 29 || 29 || 169 || 87 || 256 || 105 || 38 || 1.5 || 1.5 || 8.9 || 4.6 || 13.5 || 5.5 || 2.0
|- 
! scope="row" style="text-align:center" | 2018
|  || 1 || 1 || 0 || 0 || 1 || 1 || 2 || 1 || 1 || 0.0 || 0.0 || 1.0 || 1.0 || 2.0 || 1.0 || 1.0
|- 
! scope="row" style="text-align:center" | 2019
|  || 32 || 3 || 2 || 0 || 11 || 9 || 20 || 6 || 8 || 0.6 || 0.0 || 3.6 || 3.0 || 6.6 || 2.0 || 2.6
|- 
!
!
!
! 104
! 135
! 89
! 875
! 542
! 1417
! 456
! 261
! 1.3
! 0.9
! 8.4
! 5.2
! 13.6
! 4.4
! 2.5
|}

References

External links

Alex Fasolo's WAFL statistics from WAFL Online

Carlton Football Club players
Collingwood Football Club players
1992 births
Living people
Australian rules footballers from Western Australia
East Fremantle Football Club players
Preston Football Club (VFA) players
People educated at Trinity College, Perth
Australian people of Italian descent